Melanie Walters (born 30 January 1962) is a Welsh actress who has worked frequently in television. She is best known for playing Gwen West in the BBC sitcom Gavin & Stacey and Emma, a vampire in the third series of Being Human.

Early life
Walters was born on 30 January 1962 and raised in the Mumbles, near Swansea. Her father died when she was very young, leaving her mother to raise four children under four years old. In 1973, aged 11, she took over her brother's paper round, covering Mumbles Head every day, an experience she described at length on BBC Radio 4 in January 2012. When she was 14 she qualified as a lifeguard, working on the local beaches.

Career
Walters has worked frequently in television, but is best known for playing Gwen West in the BBC sitcom Gavin & Stacey. She was one of eight celebrities chosen to participate in an intense week learning Welsh in an eco-friendly chic campsite in Pembrokeshire in the series cariad@iaith:love4language shown on S4C in July 2011, and emerged winner of the series. Walters made a guest appearance in Casualty as Carrie on 3 February 2018.

In December 2011 she appeared in the pantomime Cinderella at the Riverfront Arts Centre in Newport.

In July 2020, it was announced that she would be taking on a lead character in the feature film Faulty Roots, directed by Ella Greenwood.

Film
La Cha Cha (2021) - as Iris
Burn Burn Burn (2015) – as Shelle
High Tide – Bethan (2014), Long Arm Films Production
Resistance (2011) – Helen Roberts
Submarine – Judie Bevan (2010)
Tan ar y Comin – Mrs. Evans (1995)

Television

Biff & Chip - Gran (2021–2022)
The Snow Spider - (2020)
Pitching In –  (2019)
Doc Martin – Heather Merchant (2015)
Under Milk Wood – "A Neighbour" (2014)
Stella – Sonographer (2013), Series 2 Episode 2
Being Human – Emma (2011)
Gavin & Stacey – Gwen West (2007–2010; 2019)
Hollyoaks – Bonnie Bevan (2007–2009)
Stopping Distance – Lisa's mother (2003)
Holby City – Melanie Hooper (2002)
Belonging – Delyth (2000–2001)
Dirty Work – Megan (2000)
Casualty – Bev Lewis (1999) (2018) - Carrie Gillespie
Jack of Hearts – Silvie (1999)
A Mind to Kill – Ruth Barra (1997)
Backup – Sally Vaughan (1997)
Dangerfield – Beverley Groves (1996)
The Bill – Ellen Reynolds (1995)
Christmas Reunion – Mrs Evans (1994)
The Healer – Gill Major (1994)
Telltale – Jean Herbert (1993)
Coronation Street – Valerie Jennings (1991)
We are Seven – Helen Powell (1989–1991)
Ballroom – Ann (1989)
The District Nurse – Milwen Parry (1987)

Theatre
Cinderella – Fairy Godmother (2014–2015)
Blue Remembered Hills – Angela (1998)

Personal life
Walters lives with her son in the Mumbles, Swansea, where she also runs a business teaching Pilates.

References

External links

Welsh film actresses
Welsh television actresses
Welsh soap opera actresses
Living people
1962 births
Actresses from Swansea
20th-century Welsh actresses
21st-century Welsh actresses